Chotpoti, is a Bengali street food popular in Bangladesh mostly in urban areas. The word 'chotpoti' translates to 'spicy'.

The dish consists mainly of potatoes, chickpeas, onions and is usually topped with additional diced chillies or grated boiled eggs. Other common toppings include tamarind chutney, coriander leaves, cumin, and crispy puri. It is usually served hot and tastes both spicy and sour at the same time. One can choose too spicy or sour or balanced according to their taste just by asking the shopkeeper.

See also 
 Bhelpuri
 Chaat
 Chaat masala
 Phuchka

References

Bangladeshi snack foods
Indian snack foods
Bengali cuisine
Bangladeshi cuisine